Coulta is a town and locality in the Australian state of South Australia located about  west of the state capital of  Adelaide and about  north-west of the municipal seat in Port Lincoln.

The township is adjacent to the Flinders Highway, and the bounded locality extends to the coast on the western side of the peninsula, facing the Great Australian Bight. Coulta was named in 1877, derived from a 'native name of a spring "Koolta"'.

Coulta is located within the federal division of Grey, the state electoral district of Flinders and the local government area of the District Council of Lower Eyre Peninsula.

History

The traditional owners of the district were the Nauo Indigenous Australians.

References

Notes

Citations

Towns in South Australia
c